The Belgian Pontifical College in Rome is a Belgian Catholic educational institution. Founded in 1844, the college is the residence for students sent by the Bishops of the Belgian dioceses to study in Rome.

History
The college was established in 1844 by the Belgian bishops, through the initiative of Monsignor Aerts, aided by Vincenzo Pecci, the Apostolic Nunciature to Belgium, nuncio in Belgium,  with the permission and support of Pope Gregory XVI.

At first it was located in the home of Mgr. Aerts, rector of the Belgian national Church of S. Guiliano. In 1845 the ancient monastery of Gioacchino ed Anna at the Quattro Fontane was purchased. The Belgian episcopate supports the students and nominates the rector.

It has been home to many famous residents, in particular the young Karol Wojtyla residing here between 1946 and 1948 together with his friend Gustaaf Joos. During his studies at Rome, Leo Joseph Suenens resided at the college and also served as the college librarian. Another famous resident was Yves Congar.

Use
The college is the residence for students sent by the Bishops of the Belgian dioceses to study in Rome. It is also the main residence of the Belgian clergy when in Rome. The students participate in the Clericus Cup.

Rectors

 1844 - 1854 Mgr. Aerts, founder and first president
 1851 - 1854 Mgr. Jozef Sonneville
 1854 - 1868 unknown.
 1868 - 1872 Mgr. Petrus Sacré
 1872 - 1878 Mgr. Victor Van den Branden de Reeth
 1880 - 1927 Mgr. de t’Serclaes
 1927 - 1945 Mgr. Oscar Joliet
 1946 - 1949 Mgr. de Furstenberg
 1949 - 1962 Mgr. Jozef Devroede
 1962 - 1972 Mgr. Albert Prignon
 1972 - 1997 Mgr. Werner Quintens
 1997 - 2008 Mgr. Johan Bonny
 2009 - current: Mgr. Dirk Smet

See also
 Roman Colleges

References

Roman Colleges
Catholic Church in Belgium
Belgium–Holy See relations
Educational institutions established in 1844
1844 establishments in the Papal States